The yoke and arrows or the yoke and the bundle of arrows is a symbolic badge dating back to the dynastic union of Spain's Catholic monarchs Ferdinand II of Aragon and Isabella I of Castile. Subsequent Catholic monarchs continued to use it on their shields to represent a united Spain and symbolize "the heroic virtues of the race".

It was also an allusion to the names of the founding monarchs: Y stood for yugo and for Ysabel (in contemporary spelling) and F stood for flechas and for Ferdinand. The yoke referred to the legend of the Gordian knot, as did Isabel and Ferdinand's motto Tanto monta; the bundle of arrows alluded to the ancient proverb that arrows can be easily broken one by one, but are unbreakable if tied together.

The Spanish Empire 
Many possessions of the Spanish Empire incorporated the yoke and arrows into their coats of arms. Although these countries and territories are no longer part of Spain, some of them retain this symbol in their heraldry.

In recent history 
The yoke and arrows became a political symbol of the Fascist Falange when it was founded in 1934, and during the Spanish Civil War it was used as one of the major emblems of the Nationalist faction. After they won the war, Falange became the sole legal party in Spain and their yoke and arrows also was a main symbol of the Francoist regime. It was eventually removed during the Spanish transition to democracy, together with the also appropriated Eagle of Saint John. 

From then on, it is no longer representative of Spain or its monarchy and has been considered a symbol of the Fascist far-right, though it continued to be present in the personal coat of arms of King Juan Carlos I. Upon his accession to the Spanish throne, King Felipe VI discontinued their use as part of his personal coat of arms.

See also 
Symbols of Francoism

References 

Falangism
Fascist symbols
Heraldic badges
Heraldic charges
Political symbols